Euclasta mirabilis is a moth in the family Crambidae. It was described by Hans Georg Amsel in 1949. It is found in Pakistan, Iran, the United Arab Emirates and Somalia.

References

Moths described in 1949
Pyraustinae